Cottee is a surname. Notable people with the surname include:

Harold Warnock Cottee (1898–1973), Australian businessman and philanthropist
Kay Cottee (born 1954), Australian sailor
Simon Cottee, academic
Tony Cottee (born 1965), English footballer, manager and commentator

See also
Cottee's, an Australian drinks brand